Events from the year 1923 in Romania. The year saw the country adopt a new constitution.

Incumbents
 King: Ferdinand I.
 Prime Minister: Ion I. C. Brătianu.

Events
 4 March – The far-right National-Christian Defense League (LANC) is founded.
 29 March – The Constitution of Union is introduced, providing a representative democracy based on universal manhood suffrage.
 17 May – The Unknown Soldier is buried in Bucharest.
 23 June – The Societatea Națională de Credit Industrial is founded by the National Bank of Romania to provide credit and financial services to the industry.
 18 December – The King Ferdinand I National Military Museum is founded.
 19 December – Elisabeth of Romania, Queen Consort, and King George II of Greece, find refuge in Romania after having to leave Greece.

Births
 26 January – Gertrud Szabolcsi, biochemist and first lady of Hungary (died 1993).
 23 February – Margarita Caranica, pen name Eta Boeriu, poet and critic (died 1984).
 2 April – Yolanda Marculescu, coloratura soprano (died 1992).
 8 October – Ion Voicu, violinist and orchestral conductor (died 1997).
 14 October – Cassius Ionescu-Tulcea, mathematician (died 2021).
 19 November – Monica Lovinescu, essayist and short story writer (died 2008).
 25 November – Paul Niculescu-Mizil, communist politician (died 2008).

Deaths
 17 July – Theodor Rosetti, prime minister 1888 to 1889 (born 1837).
 6 September – Sofronie Vulpescu, bishop (born 1856).

References

Years of the 20th century in Romania
1920s in Romania
 
Romania
Romania